The Breitstrom is a branch of the river Gera in the old part of the city of Erfurt, Thuringia, central Germany.

See also
List of rivers of Thuringia

Rivers of Thuringia
0Breitstrom
Rivers of Germany